Stephen Tyler may refer to:
 Stephen A. Tyler (1932–2020), American anthropologist
 Steven Tyler (born 1948), American singer